Contempopánea is an Indie pop Music festival that takes place every summer in Alburquerque, Badajoz; however, since 2014, the festival has been divided between this city and the capital city of Badajoz. During the festival, many artists of the Spanish indie music and thousands of their followers meet.

The festival, which was first celebrated in 1996, after being verified the success of festivals like the Benicàssim, has been consolidated like a fundamental reference inside the universe of indie festivals that are celebrated in Spain. The dynamic of this festival is quite different to the one in the rest of the mass music festivals, this is because of its only stage, its short 2 days duration, its limited capacity (around 4000 people), and forever audience who normally repeat the experience every year.

Every year, it is also organized a tribute to a legendary group which is already dissolved, like, for example, The Smiths, Family, Los Flechazos... fro what every group invited to the festival have to play a song of the group selected for that year.

Artists that have been playing in Contempopránea
The festival is mainly organized for Spanish indie groups, but there has also been some foreign groups at the festival, even so,  the Spanish ones are the predominant ones. 

 Amaral
 Astrid
 Astrud
 Bloomington
 Carrots
 Catpeople
 Cecilia Ann
 Cooper
 Cola Jet Set
 Chucho
 Deluxe
 Deneuve
 Deviot
 Digital 21
 Ellos
 Fangoria
 Los Fresones Rebeldes
 Galáctica
 Garzón ahora Grande-Marlaska
 Grupo de Expertos Solynieve
 Individual
 Juniper Moon
 L-Kan
 La Bien Querida
 La Buena Vida
 La Casa Azul
 Lacrosse
 La Granja
 La Habitación Roja
 La Monja Enana
 Lori Meyers
 Los Magnéticos
 Love of Lesbian
 Maga
 Maika Makovski
 Me Enveneno de Azules
 Mercromina (grupo)
 Meteosat (grupo)
 Nadadora
 Napoleon Solo (banda)
 Niños Mutantes
 Nóbel (grupo)
 Nosoträsh
 Pauline en la Playa
 Los Planetas
 Polar (grupo)
 Russian Red
 Señor Chinarro
 Sexy Sadie
 Sidonie
 Tender Trap
 Tarik y la fabrica de colores
 The Sunday Drivers
 Underwear tea party
 Vacaciones (grupo)
 Vetusta Morla
 We are standard
 Nacho Vegas
 Los Autonautas
 Hipo
 Cajón de Sastre
 Diane
 Supertennis

At the same time, this festival has also been an opportunity for a lot of groups, because previously to the festival, it ir organized a demo competition.

External links 
 contempopranea.com Official website

Music festivals in Spain
Spanish indie rock groups